"Sour Candy" is a song by American singer Lady Gaga and South Korean girl group Blackpink. It was released for digital download and streaming on May 28, 2020, as a promotional single off Gaga's sixth studio album, Chromatica. The song was written by Gaga, Madison Love, Rami Yacoub, Teddy Park, and its producers BloodPop and Burns. It is a deep house, dance-pop and electropop song with a house, dance and electronic beat and lyrics which compare the artists to the titular sour candy.

Most music critics appreciated the outcome of Gaga and Blackpink's collaboration, although the short length of the track received some criticism.  The song reached number one in Malaysia and Singapore and the top ten in Australia, Estonia, Greece, Hungary, and Lithuania. A remix version of "Sour Candy" by Shygirl and Mura Masa appeared on Gaga's remix album, Dawn of Chromatica (2021). Both Gaga and Blackpink have performed the song separately on live events.

Background 
"Sour Candy" was initially written in a session unrelated to the creation of the Chromatica album by Madison Love, with the help of BloodPop, Rami Yacoub, and Burns. Talking about the session, Love said:

In an interview for Japanese entertainment site TV Groove, Gaga talked about the genesis of the song and stated that "when [she] called them and asked if they wanted to write a song with [her], they were so happy and motivated. It was a really exciting collaboration." She added: "I wanted to celebrate them because they love powerful women like us, and they also wanted to celebrate me, and we had a great time together with this song. I was excited to hear them interpret the song in Korean, and told them that the part was so creative and fun. I was impressed when I heard their singing voice." Blackpink's management later talked about how the song came about: "We listened to each other's music and became fans of each other, so we naturally carried out this project."

Composition and lyrics 
"Sour Candy" is a 1990s-influenced dance-pop, electropop, bubblegum pop and deep house anthem that follows a "bouncy" house, dance and electronic beat with an upbeat production. On the song, Gaga and Blackpink are "trading off flirty lines" in English and Korean which use sour candy as a metaphor to "illustrate how they function in a relationship" as well as showing that they are rough on the outside, but sweet and authentic on the inside. Lyrically, the song sees the singers informing a potential lover to accept and not try to change their damage. The '90s house drop features Gaga performing a "speak-rap", while the K-pop group's verses include "tight, almost mechanical melodies".

According to the sheet music published on Musicnotes.com, the song is written in the time signature of common time, and is composed in the key of A minor with a tempo of 120 beats per minute.  The vocals range from the tonal nodes of G3 to C5.

Release and promotion

"Sour Candy" was released on May 28, 2020, a day before the album's release. On June 16, 2020, an accompanying lyric video was released. In an article by Rolling Stone, the video was described as the inside of a virtual reality headset, "set in a candy-coated and surreal digital landscape", with the lyrics "flashing, Matrix-style". Gil Kaufman of Billboard found the video "trippy" and "a Willy Wonka-worthy color explosion", featuring "glowing futuristic lion fish-like blobs floating in space." 

"Sour Candy" was first performed by Blackpink on January 31, 2021, during their livestream concert, The Show. In 2022, Gaga performed the song at The Chromatica Ball stadium tour. Laviea Thomas of Gigwise thought that Gaga's performance of the track "saw mesmerising synchronized choreography, and was a completely captivating experience."

Critical reception
Joey Nolfi from Entertainment Weekly called the song an "epic collaboration" and "a mouthwatering serve". Michael Roffman from Consequence of Sound said that "Sour Candy' is another banger from the Oscar winner, proving Chromatica will bring the party to our pandemic." Claire Shaffer from Rolling Stone found it "a sugar-sweet club track for all our at-home parties. Jem Asward from Variety found it "a sparkling combination of the two artists' styles". Zoe Haylock from Vulture opined that "when the lyrics can basically all be Instagram captions, you know it's a good pop song!" Cole Delbyck of HuffPost thought that the song is "fusing Gaga and Blackpink's distinct sounds into one dance-floor-primed [...] bop" and "lives up to the hype surrounding the long in the works collaboration that fans have been filling up their mentions about for years".

Louise Bruton from The Irish Times found it "the perfect mix of weirded-out pop and euphoria". Stephen Daw from Billboard complimented the song for managing to give every participants "equal, well-balanced time", although he noted that something was missing from the track that "could have rounded [it] out". Michael Cragg from The Guardian was critical of the song, saying that it "falls disappointingly flat" and "ends up sounding like a dashed off, cheaply produced interlude". Sal Cinquemani from Slant Magazine called the song "empty-calorie", while Evan Sawdey from PopMatters thought it was "blissfully short" and one of the "lesser songs" of the Chromatica album.

Commercial performance
"Sour Candy" debuted at number 33 on the Billboard Hot 100, giving Gaga her 25th top 40 hit and Blackpink their first top 40 hit. The song became Blackpink's first top-ten single in Australia, where it debuted at number 8. It also became their first top-twenty single in the UK, where it debuted at number 17. The song topped the charts in Malaysia and Singapore.

Remix
For Gaga's third remix album, Dawn of Chromatica (2021), "Sour Candy" was remixed by English musician Shygirl and Guernsey producer Mura Masa. The remix retains vocal contributions of Blackpink's Rosé and Lisa only, removing those of Jennie and Jisoo. This is a more lowkey, club version of the original, and includes subtle metallic whizzes. Writing for Gigwise, Alex Rigotti called it a "fun remix" and thought that the duo turned the song "into something more sour than candy, ridding the pop pleasantries and making it even more sultry and smoky." Joey Nolfi of Entertainment Weekly described the track as "a decadent interpretation of 'Sour Candy' [...] that'll make it easy to pucker up to the dance floor for a new groove on a familiar cut." Shygirl has included this version of the song in her live performances.

Accolades

Credits and personnel
Credits adapted from liner notes from Chromatica.

Recording locations
 Recorded at Henson Recording Studios in Los Angeles, California
 Mixed at Sterling Sound Studios in New York City, New York

Personnel
 Lady Gaga – vocals, songwriter
 Blackpink – vocals
 Burns – producer, songwriter, bass, drums, keyboards, percussion
 BloodPop – producer, songwriter, bass, drums, keyboards, percussion
 Madison Love – songwriter, backing vocals
 Teddy Park – songwriter
 Rami Yacoub – songwriter
 Benjamin Rice – mixer, recording engineer
 Tom Norris – mixer
 E. Scott Kelly – assistant mixer
 Randy Merill – mastering engineer

Charts

Weekly charts

Monthly charts

Year-end charts

Certifications

See also
 List of number-one songs of 2020 (Malaysia)
 List of number-one songs of 2020 (Singapore)

References

2020 songs
Blackpink songs
Bubblegum pop songs
Dance-pop songs
Deep house songs
Electropop songs
Interscope Records singles
Lady Gaga songs
Macaronic songs
Mura Masa songs
Number-one singles in Malaysia
Number-one singles in Singapore
Shygirl songs
Songs written by BloodPop
Songs written by Burns (musician)
Songs written by Lady Gaga
Songs written by Madison Love
Songs written by Rami Yacoub
Songs written by Teddy Park
Song recordings produced by BloodPop
Korean-language songs